Al-Ashraf Abu Al-Nasr Tuman bay, better known as Tuman bay II, (c. 1476 – 15 April 1517) was the final Mamluk Sultan of Egypt before the country's conquest by the Ottoman Empire in 1517. He ascended to the sultanic throne during the final period of Mamluk rule in Egypt, after the defeat of his predecessor, Sultan Al-Ashraf Qansuh al-Ghawri, by Ottoman Sultan Selim I at the Battle of Marj Dabiq in 1516. He was the last person to hold the title of Sultan of Egypt prior to the re-establishment of the sultanate 397 years later under Hussein Kamel in 1914.

A Circassian, who, like his predecessors, had been in early youth a domestic slave of the palace, gradually rose to be “emir of a hundred,” then prime minister, an office he held until the departure of Sultan Al-Ashraf Qansuh al-Ghawri, who left him in charge of Cairo. The Caliph Muhammad Al-Mutawakkil III having remained behind with Selim I after the defeat of Sultan Al-Ashraf Qansuh al-Ghawri, Tuman bay II was inaugurated as sultan at the age of 40, following a loss of the royal insignia in battle. His rise to power was clouded by conflict in Syria, disordered troops, distracted emirs, and a mercenary horde of Mamluks. Despite the troubled context, he was popular throughout his brief domain. In the course of time, the fugitive chiefs, with Emir Janberdi Al-Ghazali, arrived from Damascus; but another month elapsed before an army could be organized.

Name 

Al-Ashraf is an Arabic title meaning "the honorable"; Abu Al-Nasr means "who brings victory";  Tuman (Turkic: tümen) means "ten thousand"; and bay is a Turkic title meaning "chief". Tuman bay literally means "chief of 10,000 (soldiers)" in Turkic.

Gaza campaign of 1516 

Meanwhile, Tripoli, Safed and other Syrian strongholds, besides Damascus, had fallen into Ottoman hands. It was thus the beginning of December before the force now raised at Cairo, delayed and diminished by the demands of the Mamluks, set out under Emir Janberdi Al-Ghazali in the forlorn hope of saving Gaza; but before it reached its destination, Gaza had already fallen, and the army was beaten back. During Emir Janberdi Al-Ghazali’s absence, an Embassy arrived with a dispatch from Selim I who, boasting of his victories, and the adhesion of the Caliph Al-Mutawakkil III, judges, and other leaders who had joined him, demanded that the Sultan formally acknowledge his supremacy, both in the Coinage and the public Prayers. He said;

Do this and Egypt shall remain untouched; else swiftly I come to destroy thee, and thy Mamluks with thee, from off the face of the earth.

Though Selim’s envoy and his entourage were treated with hostility in the city, Sultan Tuman bay II was inclined to fall in with the Selim I's demand; but his infatuated emirs overcame his better judgment, and the Ottoman messengers were put to death. Tidings of disaster now followed rapidly on one another. Terror and dismay pervaded Cairo. The treachery of Khayr Baig and many other emirs made the prospect all the darker. The inhabitants of Gaza having, on a false report of Egyptian victory, attacked the Turkish garrison, whereby Selim's order in great numbers massacred. The news of Emir Janberdi Al-Ghazali's discomfiture increased the gloom; the more so as he, shortly after appearing, attributed the defeat not only to the numbers of the enemy but to the cowardice of his mercenary followers, while even his loyalty began to be suspected.

Battle of Ridanieh 

Sultan Tuman bay II now resolved himself to march out as far as Salahia, and meet with the Turks, weary by the desert journey; but at the last yielded to his emirs who entrenched themselves at Ridanieh, a little way out of the city. By this time, the Ottomans, having reached Arish, were marching unopposed by Salahia and Bilbeis to Khanqah; and on January 20 reached Birkat al-Hajj, a few hours from the capital. Two days later the main body confronted the Sultan’s Egyptian entrenchment; while another party that was crossing the Mocattam Hill took them on the flank. The Battle of Ridanieh was fought January 22, 1517. 

Sultan Tuman bay II fought along with a band of devoted followers; he threw himself into the midst of the Turkish ranks and reached even to Selim's tent. But in the end, the Egyptians were routed and retreated two miles (3 km) up the Nile. The Ottomans then entered the City of Cairo unopposed. They took the Citadel there and slew the entire Circassian garrison, while all around the streets became the scene of terrible outrage. Selim I himself occupied Gezira Island (الجزيرة الوسطانية), close to Bulaq. The following day, his Vizier, entering the city, endeavored to stop the wild rapine of the Turkish troops; and the Caliph Al-Mutawakkil III, who had followed in Selim's train, led the public service invoking blessing on his name. The Caliph's prayer is thus given by Ibn Ayas;

"O Lord, uphold the Sultan, Monarch both of land and the two Seas; Conqueror of both Hosts; King of both Iraqs; Minister of both Holy cities; the great Prince Selim Shah! Grant him Thy heavenly aid and glorious victories! O King of the present and the future, Lord of the Universe!"

Still plunder and riot went on. The Turks seized all they could lay hold of and demanded their captives pay large ransoms to escape death. The Circassian were everywhere pursued and mercilessly slaughtered, their heads being hung up around the battlefield. It was not till some days had passed that Selim I’s presence in the city, along with Caliph Al-Mutawakkil III, whose influence for mercy began now to be felt, put an end to these wild hostilities, and the inhabitants began again to feel some measure of security.

The following night, Sultan Tuman bay II reappeared in Cairo and with his Bedouin allies took possession of the weakly garrisoned city, and at daylight they drove back the Ottomans with great loss. The approaches were entrenched, and the Friday service once more solemnized in the name of the Egyptian Sultan. But at midnight the Turkish invaders again returned with overpowering force and scattered the Mamluks into their hiding places, while the Sultan fled across the Nile to Giza, and eventually found refuge in Upper Egypt.

Satisfied with this victory, Selim I, returning again to his island, had a red-and-white flag in token of amnesty hoisted over his tent. The Mamluks, however, were excluded from it. They were ruthlessly pursued, a proclamation was made that anyone sheltering them would be put to death, and 800 thus discovered were beheaded. Many citizens were spared at the entreaty of the Caliph, who now occupied a more prominent place than ever under the Egyptian Sultanate. The son of Sultan Al-Ashraf Qansuh al-Ghawri was received with distinction and granted the college founded by the Sultan his father as a dwelling place.

Soon after the initial amnesty, even the hidden emirs were given the chance to come forward and face Selim I's wrath. However, they were not allowed to roam free and were instead placed in cells in the Citadel. Emir Janberdi Al-Ghazali, who had fought bravely at the Battle of Ridanieh, but now cast himself at Selim's feet, was alone received with honor and even given a command to fight against the Bedouins. There is a great diversity of opinion as to when Janberdi, either openly or by collusion, took the Turkish side. The presumption is that he was faithful to the Sultan up to the Battle of Ridanieh, and then deeming the cause hopeless retired and went over to the Ottomans about the end of January. Having strongly garrisoned the Citadel, Selim I now took up his residence there, and for security had a detachment quartered at the foot of the great entrance gate.

Guerrilla campaign from Giza 

Sultan Tuman bay II had again assumed the offensive. Well supported by Mamluks and Bedouins, he had taken up a threatening attitude there, and stopped the supplies from Upper Egypt. At the last, however, wearied with the continued struggle, he made advances and offered to recognize Selim I’s supremacy if the invaders would retire. Selim thereupon commissioned the Caliph Al-Mutawakkil III with the four Qadis to accompany a Turkish deputation for the purpose of arranging terms, but the Caliph, disliking the duty, sent his Deputy instead. When Tuman bay II heard the conditions offered, he would gladly have accepted them; but was overruled by his emirs, who were distrusting Selim I, slew the Turkish members of the embassy with one of the Qadis, and thus stopped negotiations. Selim I upon this revenge himself by the equally savage act of putting to death the emirs imprisoned in the Citadel, to the number of 57.

Sultan Tuman bay II who had still a considerable following now returned to Giza; and Selim I, finding difficulty in the passage of his troops, was obliged to build a bridge of boats across the Nile. Tuman bay II gathered his forces under the Pyramids of Giza, and there, towards the end of March, the two armies met. Though well supported by his General Shadi Baig he was, after two days of fighting, beaten and sought refuge with a Bedouin chief whose life he once had saved, but who now ungratefully betrayed him into Turkish hands. He was carried in fetters into Selim I's presence, who upbraided him for his obstinate hostility and the murder of his messengers.

Capture and death 

The captive Sultan held a noble front; he denied complicity in the assassination, and spoke out so fearlessly on the justice of his cause and duty to fight for the honor and independence of his people, that Selim I was inclined to spare him, and carry him in his train to Constantinople. But the traitor Khayr Baig, and even Janberdi Al-Ghazali, urged that so long as he survived, the Ottoman rule would be in jeopardy. The argument was specious; and so the unfortunate Tuman bay II was cast into prison, and shortly after, hanged as a malefactor at the City Gate on April 15, 1517. The body remained suspended thus three days, and then was buried.

General Shadi Baig, similarly betrayed, was at the same time put to death. The sad death of Sultan Tuman bay II created such a sensation that an attempt was made by an Emir and a body of devoted followers to assassinate Selim I by night. But the Palace guard was on the alert, or the desperate design might have succeeded. Tuman Bay II, forty years of age, had reigned but three months and a half. He left no family; only his widow, a daughter of Akbercly, was captured and tortured.

Both as Governor during Sultan Al-Ashraf Qansuh al-Ghawri’s absence, and during his short Sultanate, he proved himself brave, generous and just, and his death was mourned throughout the land. Last, of the race, he was one of the best. And so with the death of Tuman bay II, the Mamluk dynasty came to its end. The Sultanate was re-established later though, but with a different dynasty, it’s known as the Muhammad Ali Dynasty

In popular culture 
A fictionalized version of his rise, in the context of the Mamluks' competition against the Ottomans over the control of the Middle East, serves as the basis for the TV series Kingdoms of Fire, in which he was portrayed by Khaled El Nabawy.

References

Further reading 
 William Muir. The Mameluke; Or, Slave Dynasty of Egypt, 1260-1517, A. D.
 Abdel-Malek, Anouar. Egypt: Military Society (1968), p. 309.
 Ibn Abi Surur. Laila Sibagh (editor). Al-Minah Al-Rahmaniyyah Fi Ad-Dawlah Al-Uthmaniyyah (1995), p.p. 86-90

External link

Year of birth unknown
1517 deaths
16th-century Mamluk sultans
Burji sultans
Circassians
Executed Egyptian people
People executed by the Ottoman Empire by hanging
People executed by hanging